Robert Stanley Hodges  (30 December 1943 – 16 April 2021) was a Canadian speed skater and scientist. He competed at the 1968 Winter Olympics and the 1972 Winter Olympics. He later became a scientist, earning his PhD from the University of Alberta, and worked as a postdoctoral researcher under Robert Bruce Merrifield at Rockefeller University. He became a professor at the University of Alberta and later at the University of Colorado School of Medicine. He died at his home in Saskatoon on 16 April 2021.

References

External links
 

1943 births
2021 deaths
Canadian male speed skaters
20th-century Canadian scientists
Olympic speed skaters of Canada
Speed skaters at the 1968 Winter Olympics
Speed skaters at the 1972 Winter Olympics
Sportspeople from Saskatoon